The 1942 Army Cadets football team represented the United States Military Academy in the 1942 college football season. In their second year under head coach Earl Blaik, the Cadets compiled a 6–3 record and outscored their opponents by a combined total of 149 to 74.  In the annual Army–Navy Game, the Cadets lost to the Midshipmen by a 14 to 0 score. The Cadets also lost to Penn and Notre Dame. 
 
Four Army players were honored on the 1942 College Football All-America Team. Tackle Robin Olds was selected as a first-team player by Grantland Rice for Collier's Weekly. Tackle Francis E. Merritt was selected as a second-team player by both the Central Press Association (CP) and the Newspaper Enterprise Association (NEA) and was later inducted into the College Football Hall of Fame. Halfback Henry Mazur was selected as a second-team player by the International News Service (INS). End James Kelleher was selected as a third-team player by the Sporting News and NEA.

Schedule

References

Army
Army Black Knights football seasons
Army Cadets football